Mubarak Shah was a Khan of the Chagatai Khanate (1252–1260, March–September 1266) he was the son and successor of Qara Hülegü.

Biography 
He was the son of Qara Hülëgü (son of Mötüken) and Ergene Khatun (daughter of Toralji Küregen). He was the first Chagatai Khan to convert to Islam. Upon the death of his father in 1252, Mubarak Shah succeeded him as Chagatai Khan, with his mother acting as regent. In 1260, however, the Great Khan claimant Ariq Böke appointed Chagatai Khan's grandson Alghu, and by the following year Alghu had control over much of the Khanate. When Alghu revolted against Ariq Böke in 1262, Orghana supported him. After Alghu died in 1266, Ergene enthroned Mubarak Shah as head of the ulus again, without the permission of Kublai Khan, who was also proclaimed the Great Khan and defeated Ariq Böke 2 years after. Kublai Khan, however, supported Baraq, a great-grandson of Chagatai as his co-ruler. Baraq gained the loyalty of Mubarak Shah's army and soon moved against him, exiling him that year. Later, Mubarak Shah supported Kaidu against Baraq in 1271, but soon felt compelled to defect to another enemy of Kaidu, the Ilkhan Abaqa.

Abaqa Khan appointed him a chief of the Qaraunas. He died of natural causes while ravaging south-east Persian regions in 1276.

Family 
He had several wives and concubines with whom he had five sons:

 Öljei Buqa
 Qutluqshah
 Boralqi
 Tutluq
 Horqadai
 Esen Pulad
 Qadaq

References 

1276 deaths
Chagatai khans
Mongol Empire Muslims
Converts to Islam from Buddhism
13th-century monarchs in Asia
Year of birth unknown